Governor Reynolds may refer to:

John Reynolds (Royal Navy officer) (c. 1713–1788), 5th Colonial Governor of Georgia from 1754 to 1757
John W. Reynolds Jr. (1921–2002), 36th Governor of Wisconsin
John Reynolds (Royal Navy officer) (c. 1713–1788), 5th Colonial Governor of Georgia
John Reynolds (Illinois politician) (1788–1865), 4th Governor of Illinois
Kim Reynolds (born 1959), 43rd Governor of Iowa
Robert J. Reynolds (1838–1909), 47th Governor of Delaware
Thomas Reynolds (governor) (1796–1844), 7th Governor of Missouri
Thomas Caute Reynolds (1821–1887), Confederate Governor of Missouri from 1862 to 1865